is the name of a large and complex Yayoi archaeological site in Yoshinogari and Kanzaki in Saga Prefecture, Kyūshū, Japan. According to the Yayoi chronology established by pottery seriations in the 20th century, Yoshinogari dates to between the 3rd century BC and the 3rd century AD. However, recent attempts to use absolute dating methods such as AMS radiocarbon dating have shown that the earliest Yayoi component of Yoshinogari dates to before 400 BC.

This archaeological site is of great importance in Japanese and world prehistory because of the massive size and important nature of the settlement and the artifacts found there. Yoshinogari consists of a settlement, a cemetery, and multiple ditch-and-palisade enclosed precincts. Bronze mirrors from China, Japanese-style bronze mirrors, bronze daggers, coins, bells, and halberds, iron tools, wooden tools, prehistoric human hair, and many other precious artifacts have been unearthed from Yoshinogari features. The total area of this site is approximately 40 hectares. This site has been continuously excavated by a number of different agencies and institutions since 1986. Due to the superior features, artifacts, and significance in Japanese prehistory and protohistory, the site was designated as a "Special National Historic Site" in 1991, and a National Park was created there in 1992. Ancient structures are being reconstructed on the site and the park is a major tourist attraction.

Yoshinogari is located 12 km from the Ariake Sea on a low hill that extends out of the Sefuri Mountains and is surrounded on three sides by land that is suitable for wet-rice (paddy) cultivation.

Early Yayoi

The earliest component of the Yoshinogari settlement formed at the southern end of the low hill extending out from the Sefuri Mountains. The earliest settlement was about 3 hectares in area and contained a ditch-enclosure. A small number of pit-houses, pit-features, and burial jars dating to this sub-period have been excavated (SPBE 2000).

Middle Yayoi

Mortuary features are prominent in this sub-period. For example, a 30 x 40 m mounded burial was constructed on the northern end of the low hill. Five of six jar burials in the centre of the mounded burial contained cylindrical jade-like glass ornaments from China and bronze daggers from the Korean peninsula. The mounded burial is located in an area away from the majority of burials, confirming the thoughts some archaeologists that those interred in the burial mound were the leaders of Yoshinogari (Barnes 1993:220-221; Imamura 1996:182; SPBE 2000).

More than 2000 burial jars dating to this period have come to light, both inside and outside of ditched areas. Many of these burials were laid out in a long row, some hundreds of metres long, parallel with the length of the low hill in the middle of the site. Artifacts excavated from the Middle Yayoi burials indicate the presence of some status distinctions. Large wooden raised-floor granaries appeared at the end of this sub-period in the middle and southern ends of the site (SPBE 2000).
An area of the Middle Yayoi settlement seems to have been dedicated to the casting of bronze implements due to the number of moulds which were found. In the same area, pottery that was common in the Chinese continent and Korean peninsula during the same period was excavated there as well. This has led some Japanese archaeologists to propose that Middle Yayoi interaction with the China was related to bronze-casting.

Late Yayoi

A large outer ditch was built around the edges of the low hill, completely surrounding the settlement and cemetery areas. Inside of the outer ditch, smaller ditch-enclosed precincts were built that surrounded groups of pit-houses and raised-floor buildings. The ditches of the inner precincts of the Late Yayoi were undoubtedly meant for defence based on the evidence of post-moulds indicating palisades on the inside of the ditches. Indeed, the so-called "Northern Inner Enclosure" was surrounded by double ditches (SPBE 2000). 
Some of the raised-floor buildings of this sub-period were quite tall and large. For example, the largest raised floor building was square in shape (12.5 X 12.5 m) with post-moulds that were 40–50 cm in diameter (SPBE 2000). Raised-floor buildings are known from large Jōmon period sites in Japan such as Sannai-Maruyama Site.

Historical perspective

The discovery and subsequent excavation of Yoshinogari caused a sustained sensation in the Japanese media in the late 1980s and early 1990s. The attention given to this site soon centred upon intense speculation that Yoshinogari could have been the capital of Yamatai, a polity mentioned in Chinese historical texts such as Weizhi and Houhanshu. Yamatai is assumed to have had implications for the formation of state-level society in the Kofun period. This issue remains somewhat controversial. However, most archaeologists state that there is no direct link between Yoshinogari and Yamatai (Barnes 1993; Yoshinogari 2001).

See also

Yayoi period
Book of Later Han - Hou han shu
Yamataikoku
Saga Prefecture
Daepyeong, a similar site in the Korean peninsula
Igeum-dong site, a similar site in the Korean peninsula
Mumun pottery period, the archaeological period in Korea that is contemporaneous with Final Jōmon and Early Yayoi
List of Special Places of Scenic Beauty, Special Historic Sites and Special Natural Monuments

References

Barnes, Gina L. 
1993. China, Korea, and Japan: The Rise of Civilization in East Asia. Thames and Hudson, London, pp. 220-221.

GARI (Gyeongnam Archaeological Research Institute)
2003. Sacheon Igeum-dong Yujeok [The Igeum-dong Site, Sacheon]. GARI, Jinju.

Imamura, Keiji
1996. Prehistoric Japan: New Perspectives on Insular East Asia. University of Hawaii Press, Honolulu, pp. 173, 182-184. 

SPBE (Saga Prefecture Board of Education)
2000. The Yoshinogari Site. SPBE, Saga City.

2001. Yoshinogari article.The Penguin Archaeology Guide, edited by Paul Bahn. Penguin, London, pp. 482.

External links

Official website of Yoshinogari Historical Park

Archaeological sites in Japan
Tourist attractions in Saga Prefecture
Former populated places in Japan
Special Historic Sites
History of Saga Prefecture
Parks and gardens in Saga Prefecture
Buildings and structures in Saga Prefecture
Museums in Saga Prefecture
Open-air museums in Japan
Yayoi period